John Flory (1886 in Lure, Haute-Saône – 9 May 1949, in Montbéliard) was a French Catholic priest, teacher and resistant. He was archpriest of the Cathedral of Montbéliard. He was a seminarist in Delle and studied theology in Besançon. He was awarded the title "Righteous Among the Nations" and was buried in Thann.

Legacy
 He was awarded "Righteous Among the Nations"
 In Montbéliard, the front of the cathedral is named after him
 In Thann, a street is named after him

References

Bibliography 
 L'Enfant du rire, preface by André Malraux, Grasset, Paris 1973. Reed. 1991, 204 p.
 Chrétiens et Juifs sous Vichy, 1940-1944 : sauvetage et désobéissance civile, Limore Yagil, Le Cerf ed., Paris, 2005, p. 601 and foll.
 L'abbé Flory (1886-1949), documents and testimonies gathered by Joseph Ball, 337 p., Besançon, 1978
 Témoins de l'Évangile : quinze siècles d’écrits spirituels d'auteurs comtois, Jean Thiébaud, preface by Lucien Daloz, L'Harmattan ed., 1999, 390 p.

1886 births
1949 deaths
People from Lure, Haute-Saône
20th-century French Roman Catholic priests
Catholic Righteous Among the Nations
French Resistance members